The Club Ministros is a handball team from Monterrey, Mexico. They participated as first Mexican team at the IHF Men's Super Globe.

Records

Men
 IHF Super Globe (World Club Championship)
Qualified - 2022
Best Finish - 12th 2022

 North American and Caribbean Senior Club Championship - 1 title
Winners - 2022
Runner-up- 2021
 Mexican Men's Handball Champion - 1 title
Winners - 2020
Runner-up- 2022

References

External links
Official instagram account

Sports teams in Monterrey
Handball clubs
1998 establishments in Mexico
Handball clubs established in 1998
Handball in Mexico